Rajarhat New Town Assembly constituency is an assembly constituency in North 24 Parganas district in the Indian state of West Bengal.

Overview
As per orders of the Delimitation Commission, No. 115 Rajarhat New Town Assembly constituency is composed of the following: Ward Nos. 1–5,12-14,20-21 of Bidhannagar Municipal Corporation (Before 2015 Wards 1-6 & 10-13 of Rajarhat-Gopalpur Municipality) and Ward 27 of Bidhannagar Municipal Corporation(formerly Mahisbathan–II gram panchayat of Rajarhat CD Block) and remaining Rajarhat CD Block

Rajarhat New Town Assembly constituency is part of No. 17 Barasat (Lok Sabha constituency). Rajarhat (SC) was part of Dum Dum (Lok Sabha constituency).

Members of Legislative Assembly

Election results

2021

2016

2011
In the 2011 election, Sabyasachi Dutta of Trinamool Congress defeated his nearest rival Tapash Chatterjee of CPI(M).

.# Swing calculated on Congress+Trinamool Congress vote percentages taken together in 2006.

1977–2006 Rajarhat
In the 2006 state assembly elections, Rabindranath Mandal of CPI(M) won the Rajarhat (SC) assembly seat defeating Tanmoy Mondal of Trinamool Congress. Contests in most years were multi cornered but only winners and runners are being mentioned. In 2001 Tanmoy Mondal of Trinamool Congress defeated Rabindranath Mandal of CPI(M). Prior to that Rabindranath Mondal had won the seat five times in a row defeating Tanmoy Mondal representing Congress in 1996, Sukumar Roy of Congress in 1991, Biswananda Naskar of Congress in 1987, Tanmoy Mondal of Congress in 1982 and Amalendu Sekhar Naskar of Congress in 1977.

1962–1972 Rajarhat
Khagendranath Mondal of Congress won in 1972 and 1971. Rabindranath Mondal of CPI(M) won in 1969. S.N.Das of CPI(M) won in 1967. Pranab Prasad Roy of CPI won in 1962. Prior to that the Rajarhat seat was not there.

References

Assembly constituencies of West Bengal
Politics of North 24 Parganas district